Walter Leigh Rayfield  (7 October 1881 – 19 February 1949) was a Canadian recipient of the Victoria Cross, the highest award for gallantry in the face of the enemy that can be awarded to British and Commonwealth forces. The other six were Bellenden Hutcheson, Arthur George Knight, William Henry Metcalf, Claude Joseph Patrick Nunney, Cyrus Wesley Peck and John Francis Young.

Details
Rayfield was 36 years old, and a private in the 7th (1st British Columbia) Battalion, Canadian Expeditionary Force during the First World War when the following deed took place for which he was awarded the VC.

These events took place from 2–4 September 1918 during the operations east of Arras, France:Ahead of his company, he rushed a trench occupied by a large party of the enemy, personally bayoneting two and taking ten prisoners. Later, he located and engaged with great skill, under constant rifle fire, an enemy sniper who  was causing many casualties. He then rushed the section of trench from which the sniper had been operating, and so demoralised the enemy by his coolness and daring that thirty others surrendered to him. Again,  regardless of  his personal  safety, he left cover under heavy machine-gun fire and carried in a badly wounded comrade. He was awarded the Silver Medal of the Belgian Order of the Crown on 22 December 1919.
Rayfield was the Progressive Party of Canada "Soldier candidate" in the federal election of 1921 for Toronto East. Liberal nominee Mrs. Philip G. Kiely (Elizabeth Bethune Kiely) stood aside for Rayfield, so that her votes could go to him, but the Conservative candidate won. He was Sergeant-at-Arms of the Legislative Assembly of Ontario and governor of Toronto Jail.

He died in 1949, and is buried at Prospect Cemetery, Toronto, Ontario, Canada (Soldier's Plot, Section 7, grave 4196).

The Medal
His Victoria Cross is displayed at the Canadian War Museum in Ottawa, Ontario, Canada.

References

External links 
 Walter Leigh Rayfield's digitized service file
 Legion Magazine-The Magnificent Seven
 Rayfield's Medals at the Canadian War Museum
 

Canadian World War I recipients of the Victoria Cross
1881 births
1949 deaths
People from Richmond, London
English emigrants to Canada
Canadian Expeditionary Force soldiers
Canadian prison officials
Recipients of the Order of the Crown (Belgium)
Progressive Party of Canada candidates in the 1921 Canadian federal election
Military personnel from Surrey